Sueña may refer to:

"Sueña", Spanish version of the 1996 Disney song "Someday" (Disney song) performed by Luis Miguel
"Sueña", 2002 song by Intocable
"Sueña", 2004 song by La Banda Gorda
"Sueña", 2012 song by Jencarlos Canela
"Sueña", 2016 song by Sofia Carson